Treaty ports were the port cities in China and Japan that were opened to foreign trade mainly by the unequal treaties forced upon them by Western powers, as well as cities in Korea opened up similarly by the Japanese Empire.

Chinese treaty ports 

The British established their first treaty ports in China after the First Opium War by the Treaty of Nanking in 1842. As well as ceding the island of Hong Kong to the United Kingdom in perpetuity, the treaty also established five treaty ports at Shanghai, Guangzhou (Canton), Ningbo, Fuzhou, and Xiamen (Amoy). The following year the Chinese and British signed the Treaty of the Bogue, which added provisions for extraterritoriality and the most favored nation status for the latter country. Subsequent negotiations with the Americans (1843 Treaty of Wanghia) and the French (1844 Treaty of Whampoa) led to further concessions for these nations on the same terms as the British.

The second group of treaty ports was set up following the end of the Arrow War in 1860 and eventually, more than 80 treaty ports were established in China alone, involving many foreign powers.

Characteristics
Foreigners all lived in prestigious sections newly built for them on the edges of existing port cities. They enjoyed legal extraterritoriality, as stipulated in the unequal treaties. Some of these port areas were directly leased by foreign powers such as in the concessions in China, effectively removing them from the control of local governments.

Western images of the Chinese treaty ports focus on the distinctive geography of the “bund,” a long narrow strip of land in a prime location on the waterfront where the businesses, offices, warehouses, and residences of all foreigners were located. The Shanghai Bund was the largest and most famous. The North Riverbank in Ningbo (nowadays known as the Old Bund), was the first in China, opening in 1844, 20 years before the Shanghai bund. A typical bund contained British, German, French, American, Japanese, and other nationals.

The bund was a self-governing operation with its own shops, restaurants, recreational facilities, parks, churches, courts, police, and local government. The facilities were generally off-limits to the natives. The British, who by far dominated foreign trade with China, normally were the largest presence. Businessmen and officials typically brought their own families with them and stayed for years but sent their older children back to England for education.

Chinese sovereignty was only nominal. Officially, the foreign powers were not allowed to station military units in the bund, but in practice, there often was a warship or two in the harbor.

Chinese capitulation treaties 
The treaty port system in China lasted approximately one hundred years. It began with the 1841 Opium War. The major powers involved were the British, the French, and the Americans, although by the end of the 19th century all the major powers were involved.

The system effectively ended when Japan took control of most of the ports in the late 1930s, the Russians relinquished their treaty rights in the wake of the Russian revolution in 1917, and the Germans were expelled in 1914. The three main treaty powers, the British, the Americans, and the French, continued to hold their concessions and extraterritorial jurisdictions until the Second World War. This ended when the Japanese stormed into their concessions in late 1941. They formally relinquished their treaty rights in a new "equal treaties" agreement with Chiang Kai-shek's Nationalist Government in exile in Chungking in 1943. The international communities that were residues of the treaty port era ended in the late 1940s when the communists took over and nearly all foreigners left.

Impact on China
Although the great majority of Chinese lived in traditional rural areas, a handful of booming treaty port cities became vibrant centers that had an enormous long-term impact on the Chinese economy and society. Above all Shanghai became the dominant urban center. Tianjin and  Shenyang followed; Hong Kong, although a British colony, not a treaty port was similar. Foreigners were welcomed and had stable safe bases, as did Christian missionaries. Outside the ports, the only foreigners were occasional Christian missionaries, and they often encountered serious difficulties. The other 89 cities that became treaty ports between 1842 and 1914 were of minor importance.

The Shanghai International Settlement rapidly developed into one of the world's most modern cities, often compared to Paris, Berlin, and London.  It set the standard of modernity for China and all of East Asia. In Shanghai, the British and American settlements combined in 1863 into an international settlement, with the French settlement operated separately nearby. The foreigners took out long-term leases on the land and set up factories, offices, warehouses, sanitation, police, gardens, restaurants, hotels, banks, and private clubs. The Shanghai Municipal Council was created in 1854, with nine members who were elected by three dozen foreign landowners at first, and by about 2,000 electors in the 1920s. Chinese residents comprised 90% of the total population of Shanghai but complained about taxation without representation. Eventually, the Council admitted five Chinese representatives.

The European community promoted technological and economic innovation, as well as knowledge industries, that proved especially attractive to Chinese entrepreneurs as models for their cities across the growing nation.  Port cities combined several leadership roles. First of all, they were the major port of entry for all imports and exports - except for opium, which was handled by smugglers in other cities. Foreign entrepreneurs introduce the latest European manufacturing techniques, providing a model followed sooner or later by all of China. The first establishments focused on shipbuilding, ship repair, railway repair, and factories producing textiles, matches, porcelain, flour, and machinery. Tobacco, cigarettes, textiles, and food products were the specialty in Canton. Financing was handled by branch banks, as well as entirely new operations such as HSBC -the Hong Kong and Shanghai Banking Corporation, which remains a world-class establishment into the 21st century.   Across the modernizing world, railway construction was a major financial and industrial endeavor, usually led by the British. Investments now poured into building a railway-plus-telegraph system knitting China together, connecting the treaty ports, and other major cities, as well as mining districts and agricultural centers. Chinese entrepreneurs learned their skills in the port cities, and soon applied for and received bank loans for their startups. Chinese merchants headquartered there set up branches across Southeast Asia, including British Singapore and Malaya, the Dutch East Indies, French Indochina, and the American Philippines.

The information industry flourished in the port cities, with printing shops, newspapers, magazines, and pamphlets in Chinese and European languages. Book publishers often featured Chinese translations of European classics in philosophy, politics, literature, and social issues.  According to historian Klaus Mühlhahn:
This vast network, with Shanghai as its center, spurred the transformation of the Chinese urban population. In their thoughts, tastes, and daily activities, the educated and affluent groups of the urban population began to abandon traditional ways of living and started to embrace what they saw as modern lifestyles.

Christian missionaries saw all of the Chinese population as their target audience, but they were headquartered in the port cities. The missionaries had very modest success in the conversion of the Chinese population but discovered they became widely  popular for setting up medical and educational facilities. For example, St John's University in Shanghai (1879-1952) first set up faculties of theology, Western learning, and  Chinese languages, then expanded to cover literature, science, medicine, and intense coverage of Western languages eagerly sought by the ambitious Chinese intellectuals and entrepreneurs who had rejected the old Confucian exam system for the Western model of modernity. Engineering schools were established as well, and by 1914 a network of universities, colleges, teacher training schools, and specialized industrial schools was headquartered in the Port cities, and diffusing their alumni across urban China.

Students poured into the port cities. Many adopted ideas and used the facilities newly opened to them to network with each other, set up organizations and publications, and plot a revolution against the Qing government. Aggressive Japanese moves to dominate China in World War I caused a strong backlash of nationalism in the May Fourth Movement, which focused its ire not just on Japan, but also on the entire port city system as emblematic of imperialism that should no longer be tolerated. The national government had almost no police power in the port cities, allowing secret societies to flourish in the Chinese community, some of which turned into criminal gangs. Eventually, Shanghai had a strong underground illegal underworld that was ready to employ violence.

Major treaty ports 
For encyclopedic details on each treaty port, see Robert Nield's China’s Foreign Places: The Foreign Presence in China in the Treaty Port Era, 1840-1943 (2015).

Leased territories 
In these territories the foreign powers obtained, under a lease treaty, not only the right to trade and exemptions for their subjects but a truly colonial control over each concession territory, de facto annexation:

Japanese treaty ports 
Japan opened two ports to foreign trade, Shimoda and Hakodate, in 1854 (Convention of Kanagawa), to the United States. 
In 1858, the Treaty of Amity and Commerce designated four more ports, Kanagawa, Hyogo, Nagasaki, and Niigata. The treaty with the United States was followed by similar ones with Britain, the Netherlands, Russia, and France. The ports permitted legal extraterritoriality for citizens of the treaty nations. The system of treaty ports ended in Japan in the year 1899 as a consequence of Japan's rapid transition to a modern nation. Japan had sought treaty revision earnestly, and in 1894, signed a new treaty with Britain which revised or abrogated the previous "unequal" treaty.  Other countries signed similar treaties.  The new treaties came into force in July 1899.

Korean treaty ports 

Following the Ganghwa Treaty of 1876, the Korean kingdom of Joseon agreed to the opening of three strategic ports and the extension of legal extraterritoriality to merchants from Meiji Japan. The first port opened in this manner was Busan, while Incheon and Wonsan followed shortly thereafter. These cities became important centers of mercantile activity for traders from China and Japan until Korea's colonization by Japan in 1910.

See also 

 Economic history of China before 1912
 Shanghai International Settlement
 Unequal treaties
 Concessions in China
 List of Chinese treaty ports

References

Further reading
 Bickers, Robert, and Isabella Jackson, eds. Treaty Ports in Modern China: Law, Land and Power (Routledge, 2016).
 Bracken, Gregory. "Treaty Ports in China: Their Genesis, Development, and Influence." Journal of Urban History 45#1  (2019): 168–176. online
 Brunero, Donna, and Stephanie Villalta Puig, eds.  Life in Treaty Port China and Japan (Palgrave, 2018), scholarly essays
 Deuchler, Martina.Confucian Gentlemen and Barbarian Envoys: The Opening of Korea, 1875-1885 (University of Washington Press, 1977).
 Gull E. M. British Economic Interests in the Far East (1943); focus on the treaty ports online
 Hamashita, Takeshi. "Tribute and treaties: East Asian treaty ports networks in the era of negotiation, 1834–1894." European journal of East Asian studies 1.1 (2002): 59–87.
 Hibbard, Peter The Bund Shanghai: China Faces West (Odyssey Illustrated Guides, 2007)
 Hoare. J.E. Japan's Treaty Ports and Foreign Settlements: The Uninvited Guests, 1858–1899  (RoutledgeCurzon, 1995) .
 Johnstone, William C. "The status of foreign concessions and settlements in the Treaty Ports of China." American Political Science Review 31.5 (1937): 942–948. Online
 Morse, Hosea Ballou. International Relations of the Chinese Empire: The  Period of Conflict: 1834-1860. (1910) online 
 Morse, Hosea Ballou. International Relations of the Chinese Empire: The  Period of Submission: 1861–1893. (1918) online
 Morse, Hosea Ballou. International Relations of the Chinese Empire: The  Period of Subjection: 1894-1911  (1918) online
 Morse, Hosea Ballou. The Trade and Administration of the Chinese Empire (1908) online
 Nakabayashi, Masaki. "Imposed Efficiency of Treaty Ports: Japanese Industrialization and Western Imperialist Institutions." Review of Development Economics 18.2 (2014): 254–271. Online
 Nield, Robert.  China’s Foreign Places: The Foreign Presence in China in the Treaty Ports (2015) Online 
 Patterson, Wayne. William Nelson Lovatt in Late Qing China: War, Maritime Customs, and Treaty Ports, 1860–1904 (Lexington Books, 2019).
 Sewell, Bill. "East Asian Treaty Ports as Zones of Encounter." Journal of Urban History 45#6  (2019): 1315-1325 online.
 Sigel, Louis T. "Foreign Policy Interests and Activities of the Treaty-Port Chinese Community." in Reform in Nineteenth-Century China (Brill, 1976) pp. 272–281.
 Sigel, Louis T. "Urbanization, Modernization, and Identity in Asia: A Historical Perspective". Modern China 4#4 (1978)  pp 461–490.
 Tai, En-Sai. Treaty ports in China: A study in diplomacy (Columbia UP, 1918) online.
 Taylor, Jeremy E.  "The bund: littoral space of empire in the treaty ports of East Asia." Social History 27.2 (2002): 125-142.
 Wood, Frances. No Dogs and Not Many Chinese: Treaty Port Life in China 1843-1943 (1998) 
 Zinda, Yvonne Schulz  "Representation and Nostalgic Re-invention of Shanghai in Chinese film." in Port Cities in Asia and Europe (2008): 159+.

Primary sources
 Cortazzi, Hugh, ed. Victorians in Japan: In and around the Treaty ports (A&C Black, 2013), Anthology of primary sources.
 Dennys, Nicholas Belfield. The Treaty Ports of China and Japan. A Complete Guide to the Open Ports of Those Countries, Together with Peking, Yedo, Hongkong and Macao. Forming a Guide Book & Vade Mecum... With 29 Maps and Plans (1867). online
 Wright, Arnold. Twentieth century impressions of Hongkong, Shanghai, and other treaty ports of China: their history, people, commerce, industries, and resources (1908) online

External links 
 
 WorldStatesmen: China
 Omniatlas: Map of treaty port system in China in 1907 (earlier dates also available)
 Treaty ports in China, 1557-1999

History of European colonialism

Free trade imperialism
19th century in Japan
History of the foreign relations of Japan
History of the foreign relations of China